The Cape Flats is an expansive, low-lying, flat area situated to the southeast of the central business district of Cape Town. The Cape Flats is also the name of an administrative region of the City of Cape Town, which lies within the larger geographical area.

Geology and geography

In geological terms, the area is essentially a vast sheet of aeolian sand, ultimately of marine origin, which has blown up from the adjacent beaches over a period on the order of a hundred thousand years. Below the sand, the bedrock is in general the Malmesbury Shale, except on part of the western margin between Zeekoevlei to the south and Claremont and Wetton to the north, where an intrusive mass of Cape Granite is to be found. Most of the sand is unconsolidated; however, in some places near the False Bay coast the oldest sand dunes have been cemented into a soft sandstone (calcrete), and form low cliffs at the edge of the beach. These formations contain important fossils of animals such as the extinct Cape lion and also provide evidence that stone-age people hunted here tens of thousands of years ago.

Extent
To the west the expanse of the Cape Flats is limited by rising ground that slopes up to the steep cliffs of the Cape Peninsula mountain chain (see the photograph on the left), while in the east the land rises gradually towards the equally rugged cliffs of Hottentots Holland mountains and other elevated regions of the interior of the Boland.

Climate
The area has a Mediterranean climate, with warm dry summers and cool, damp winters. It is generally exposed to the wind, both from the northwest (winter) and southeast (summer). Flooding can be a problem, especially in July and August. Cold wet spells, especially in August and September, can make life very difficult for those living in sub-standard housing.

Drainage
Historically the Cape Flats was partly covered in wetlands, particularly during winter. Many of these have been destroyed by canalisation and infilling to provide residential space. Many of the remaining perennial vleis are at the southwest side of the region. (Zeekoevlei, Rondevlei, Zandvlei etc.)
Elsieskraal River and the Black River catchment (northwest)
The Diep River
Zeekoevlei and its catchment
The Eerste River
The Kuils River

History

Before 1950
The noted English naturalist, William John Burchell, remarked in 1811 that the deep sand of the Flats made travel by cart or wagon extremely difficult. The situation was aggravated by a widespread shortage of firewood, causing fuel collectors to cut the relatively few indigenous shrubs and trees that stabilised the sand.

During the second half of the 19th century, the area was completely overrun by alien vegetation, mainly of Australian origin. The plants included hakeas and especially wattles (genus Acacia). The principal reason for this infestation lay in decisions made by the colonial authorities. It was an era before the advent of modern technological methods for the construction of permanent roads and in those days the Cape Flats was a massive sea of unstabilised sand dunes that moved with the winds. This made travel between Cape Town and the interior very difficult, particularly for the large ox-drawn wagons of the time. The authorities decided to try to stabilise the sand with plants native to the British colonies of New South Wales and Western Australia.

The earliest importation of wattles was in 1827. Massive plantings were established in the 1840s and 1850s and the work continued until well after 1875.

At the time, the plan worked well enough: the march of the dunes was arrested. The price paid, in ecological terms, was that the Cape Flats was carpeted by invasive species. Serious efforts have in recent years been made to roll back this alien scourge.

Since 1950

The Cape Flats has undergone dramatic change in the past half a century. In 1950 the area was practically uninhabited. There was a single, narrow road across the Flats from Cape Town to The Strand that ran between walls of alien rooikrans bushes and one could travel for miles without seeing any sign of habitation other than a few fences and a handful of farmhouses. Native antelope roamed at will between the dense thickets of wattles. The army used the area for military exercises and the few farmers who inhabited the Flats eked out a living by growing vegetables in pockets of relatively poor soil between the barren dunes. Modern amenities were unknown; telephones were unknown, drinking water was collected in tanks from roofs and at night the rooms were lit by oil lamps.

The era of sand and antelopes vanished completely in little more than a generation. Vegetable farming persisted, but to a much lesser extent, because urbanisation enveloped vast tracts of land in short order.

The first use of the Cape Flats to remove people of colour from the more central urban areas was the township of Langa, which saw large scale removal after the Natives (Urban Areas) Act of 1923. It is the oldest township in Cape Town and was the location of much resistance to apartheid. Its origins go back to the 19th century.

During the apartheid era, race-based legislation such as the Group Areas Act and pass laws either forced non-white people out of more central urban areas designated for white people and into government-built townships in the Cape Flats, or made living in the area illegal, forcing many people into informal settlements elsewhere in the Cape Flats. Large housing projects were built here, mostly as part of the Nationalist government's larger effort to force the so-called Coloured communities & other people of Colour (mostly Xhosa) out of the central and western areas of Cape Town, which were designated as white areas under the Group Areas Act.

This meant that only whites could reside there permanently, as under the apartheid system black Africans were officially made citizens of native reserves (called "homelands"), therefore having resident worker status, despite often never having been there & having spent their entire lives in the now "designated white" regions.

Since many of the mostly Xhosa workers and their families, were designated under apartheid as citizens of assigned native reserves/homelands, many who were out of formal work were obliged to live in the area illegally, further contributing to the growth of informal settlements.

In addition to the extant townships of the mid-century, other large townships (such as Mitchell's Plain & Khayelitsha across the road) were created on the flats in the 1970s & 1980s. Both have become among the largest residential areas in Cape Town and some of the largest in the country at large.

Large scale rural-urban migration has rapidly increased the population, putting strain on housing with major increases in informal shack settlement, including in areas that were originally created on a planned basis, e.g. Khayelitsha.

One of the major priorities of the RDP (Reconstruction & Development Programme) is to build houses.

Since the end of apartheid, these communities are no longer legally bound by racial restrictions; but history, language, economics and ethnic politics still contribute to homogeneity of local areas. So, for example, most residents of Mitchell's Plain likely still speak a locally inflected version of Afrikaans, along with English and either they or their parents were designated as Coloured by apartheid; most residents of Khayelitsha still speak Xhosa and English and either they or their parents were designated as Black by apartheid. Nonetheless, some areas of the Cape Flats have an increasing diversity of residents, with Xhosa-speaking people an increasingly noticeable presence in some previously mainly Afrikaans-speaking areas.

Culture and politics
Popular musicians from the area include jazz artist Abdullah Ibrahim and Basil Coetzee, who named their song "Mannenberg" after a Cape Flats township, and Brenda Fassie. There is an active hip hop movement as well.

Its religious communities include (to name only a few), Afrikaans-speaking congregations of the Dutch Reformed Church, Rastafarian communities, people who engage only in traditional Xhosa practices, syncretic Xhosa Christian churches, evangelical Christian churches, and southern Africa's largest Muslim community (drawing its oldest roots from the historic Cape Muslim community, which dates back to the 17th century).

In the 1940s, a type of dental modification known as a passion gap became fashionable and remains popular today. The modification involves the removal of a person's top front teeth.

Its political history is complex and sometimes baffling even to insiders: for instance, the politics of the Coloured communities of the Cape Flats have included Trotskyist activism in earlier years, and mobilisation for the ANC's United Democratic Front in the 80s; and then, widespread support for the historically white National Party (which had presided over apartheid) in the early post-apartheid elections. More recently, the area has seen an expansion of African National Congress strength from its base in the black townships and into historically Coloured areas, as well as a particularly strong local growth of left-wing social movements like the Treatment Action Campaign which offer a critique of government policies.

Crime

Cape Flats is one of the most violent and dangerous places in South Africa. Violent Islamist movements have emerged from Cape Flats communities as well.

Almost all of the communities of the Cape Flats remain, to one degree or another, poverty-stricken. Serious social problems include a high rate of unemployment and high levels of gang activity. During the late 1990s and early 2000s, there was significant armed conflict between various gangs and PAGAD (People Against Gangsterism and Drugs), a vigilante organisation. Post-apartheid development projects, such as the RDP, have also led to violent conflicts within communities. As of 2014, efforts to combat gangs include Hanover Park's Ceasefire programme, where former gang members "use their experiences to mediate gang disputes and help young men and women quit gang life. The gang violence escalated to the point where the South African National Defence Force had to be deployed to the gang-ridden areas of the Cape Flats to help the provincial police force deal with the increasing gang violence.

A wide range of community empowerment organisations work non-violently to combat the poverty, crime and health problems, and the role of civil society in many parts of the area is relatively strong.

Natural habitats on the Cape Flats

Suburbs on the Cape Flats

Athlone
Bonteheuwel
Hanover Park
Khayelitsha
Langa
Lavender Hill
Parkwood
Ottery
Manenberg
Mitchells Plain
Bishop Lavis
Matroosfontein
Macassar
Gugulethu
Strandfontein
Nyanga
Philippi
Lotus River
Grassy Park

See also

References

External links
 Cape Flats Details An extensive photojournalism project on the area and its people.
 Capeflats.org A personal web site with an overview of the language, politics and culture of the area.
 CAFDA The Cape Flats Development Association's website.
 Cape Flats tourism A government Cape Flats tourism initiative hopes to bring more visitors.
 CapeFlatsNature.org Organisation aims to organise impoverished residents to help sustain areas of biodiversity.
 CFNR The website of the Cape Flats Nature Reserve.
 ISS paper June 2003 paper on "The social contradictions of organised crime on the Cape Flats".
 The Cape Flats Website

Geologic formations with imbedded sand dunes
Geology of South Africa
Geography of Cape Town
Geologic formations of Africa